David Stephenson is an American poet and engineer.

He graduated from the Massachusetts Institute of Technology and from the University of Wisconsin with degrees in engineering.

His work has appeared in California Quarterly, Edge City Review, The Formalist, Hellas, The Lyric, Pivot, and Slant. His semenal work, Rhythm and Blues won the Richard Wilbur Award in 2007; this compelling work focused on post-industrial Americana, largely drawn from his Rust Belt upbringing.

He lives in Detroit, Michigan.

Awards
 Margaret Haley Carpenter Prize
 Howard Nemerov Award three-time finalist
 Richard Wilbur Award (2007)

Works
"Bunker", Able Muse
Rhythm and Blues University of Evansville Press, January 1, 2008,

Reviews
This is a book you rush through as if on oiled tracks—and before you know it the ride is over. The joy of the trip is partly due to the straightforwardness of the poems— recognizable situations, narrative and idea easily expressed, lack of complicated rhetorical devices

References

American male poets
MIT School of Engineering alumni
University of Wisconsin–Madison College of Engineering alumni
Living people
Poets from Michigan
Year of birth missing (living people)